Javier Rojas Alvarez (born 15 April 1991 in Tucumán) is an Argentine rugby union footballer playing as a fullback or as a centre. He currently plays for the Cornish Pirates in the English RFU Championship. He previously played for a number of clubs including Uni Tucumán, Pampas XV in the South African Vodacom Cup, French side Albi in Pro D2 and Rugby Viadana in the Italian Top12.

He has four caps for Argentina, since 2012, with 1 try scored, 5 points on aggregate. He competed at the 2016 Summer Olympics for the Argentina national rugby sevens team.

Honors and records
 RFU Championship Cup top points scorer: 2018–19 (65 points)

Notes

References

External links
 
 
 
 
 
 

1991 births
Living people
Argentina international rugby sevens players
Argentina international rugby union players
Argentine rugby union players
Cornish Pirates players
Olympic rugby sevens players of Argentina
Pampas XV players
Rugby sevens players at the 2016 Summer Olympics
Rugby union centres
Rugby union players from Buenos Aires
Universitario Rugby Club de Tucumán players